On My Way Here is the fourth studio album released by Clay Aiken on May 6, 2008. This album of both ballads and pop-rock is an eclectic mix of styles and tempos. Aiken wanted to get away from using multiple producers and chose Grammy Award-winning British producer Mark 'Kipper' Eldridge (Sting, Chris Botti) to produce the album. Jaymes Foster was the executive producer. This was his final studio album for RCA.

The title track, "On My Way Here", written by OneRepublic frontman Ryan Tedder along with Hunter Davis and Chris Faulk, was the only single released. The song was originally for Tedder's debut album back in 2002, under Freelance Entertainment, which became defunct before the album could release. The song is about how the lessons we learn growing up shape us into the adults we become. This struck a chord with Aiken and the song became the inspiration for the album's theme.

The last track "Lover All Alone", written by Aiken and David Foster and originally available as an iTunes bonus with Aiken's A Thousand Different Ways album, was produced by Emanuel Kiriakou.

Sales and chart performance
The album, selling 94,000 units in its first week, made its debut on the Billboard charts at number four on the Billboard 200 and #1 on Billboard Top Internet Albums. The album debuted on Billboard's Top Canadian Albums at number twenty-five for the week ending May 24, 2008.

Track listing

Additional personnel

 Nathaniel Kunkel – Recorded and Mixed
 Cameron Craig – String Engineer
 Joe Harding – Engineer
 Chris Jennings – Engineer
 Wesley Seidman – Engineer
 Jorge Vivo – Engineer
 Bernard Levin – Asst. Engineer
 Dale Parsons – Asst. Engineer
 Nick Banns – Asst. Engineer
 Tyler Van Dalen – Asst. Engineer
 David Jones – Asst. Engineer
 Keith Carlock – drums
 Freddie Washington – Bass
 Jon Herington – guitars
 Jeff Young – Piano, B3 Hammond, Background Vocals
 Oz Noy – Guitars (appears courtesy of Magnatude Records)
 Keith Beauvais – Guitars, Production
 David Foster – Piano ("The Real Me")
 David Hartley – Piano ("Something About Us" and "Sacrificial Love"),
 Dominic Miller – Nylon Guitar ("Sacrificial Love")
 Jon Ossman – Bass ("Falling")
 Kipper – Keyboards, Programming
 Mark Neary – Additional Pro Tools
 Quiana Parler – Background vocals
 Angela Fisher – Background Vocals
 Jenny Hill – Background Vocals
 Windy Wagner – Background Vocals
 Sumudu Jayatilaka – Background Vocals

Strings

 David Hartley – Arranger
 Dermot Crehan – Violin (solo on "As Long as We're Here")
 Perry Montague-Mason – Violin
 Warren Zielinski – Violin
 Emlyn Singleton – Violin
 Patrick Kierman – Violin
 Boguslaw Kostecki – Violin
 Tom Bowes – Violin
 Maciej Rakowski – Violin
 Julian Leaper – Violin
 Chris Tombling – Violin
 Dave Woodcock – Violin
 Mark Berrow – Violin
 Jackie Shave – Violin
 Jonathan Rees – Violin
 Dermot Crehan – Violin
 Peter Lale – Viola
 Bruce White – Viola
 Katie Wilkinson – Viola
 Rachael Bolt – Viola
 Anthony Pleeth – Cello
 Martin Loveday – Cello
 Dave Daniels – Cello
 Jonthan Williams – Cello
 Chris Laurence – Bass

"Lover All Alone"
 Emanuel Kiriakou – Piano, Guitar (Acoustic & Electric), keyboards
 Doug Petty – Hammond B-3
 Cameron Stone – Cello
 Jimi Englund – Shaker

Additional notes
In an interview with Linda Loveland of WRAL-TV prior to the album's release,  Aiken said that a couple of the songs on this album, while previously recorded, had not been widely heard.
"The Real Me" was originally recorded by Natalie Grant for her album Awaken (2005). Aiken stated in an interview that Grant rewrote some of the lyrics for him. "The Real Me" was covered by Jessie Clark Funk on the 2009 Be Thou An Example CD from Songs for the Youth produced by the EFY cd's. "Something About Us" was written and recorded by Michael O'Brien for his album Something About Us (2007). "As Long as We're Here" was recorded by Kristy Starling for her self-titled debut album (2003)

Recording and mixing
 Lower Barn, London, UK
 Legacy Studios, New York City, NY
 Grove Studios, London, UK
 Ocean Way Recording, Los Angeles, CA
 Robert Irving Studios, Los Angeles, CA
 Studio Without Walls, Los Angeles, CA – mixing
 Marcussen Mastering, Hollywood, CA – mastering
 Lover All Alone
 Chalice Studios/Studio E, Los Angeles, CA – recording, mixing
 NRG Studios, North Hollywood, CA

Webisodes
Promotion for this album included a series of short filmed interviews of Aiken commenting on the making of the album.  These interviews, known as Webisodes, are all on his official YouTube page along with a video that was filmed for the first single from this album.

QVC bonus disc
Aiken debuted the album on QVC before its release. As a bonus with pre-orders, a second Enhanced CD was included containing 3 live Sessions@AOL recordings, 1 unreleased recording and an unreleased video that had been filmed for his 2003 Measure of a Man album.
 "When I Need You"
 "Invisible" (Live)
 "Measure Of A Man" (Live)
 "I Will Carry You" (Live)
Enhanced CD Portion: "This Is The Night" (Unreleased Video) Directed by: Matthew Rolston
tracks 2, 3 and 4 from Sessions@AOL, November 2003 and December 2004

MusicPass
This album is also available in a new music format called MusicPass. The MusicPass is a gift card that gives access to a digital version of the album for iPods and MP3 players. Included as a bonus are 3 music videos and a digital booklet.
 "Invisible" – music video
 "The Way" – music video
 "A Thousand Days" – music video

References

2008 albums
Clay Aiken albums
RCA Records albums
19 Recordings albums
Albums produced by Kipper (musician)